Mishikha is a rural locality (a settlement) in Kabansky District, Republic of Buryatia, Russia. The population was 72 as of 2010. There are 5 streets.

Geography 
Mishikha is located 92 km southwest of Kabansk (the district's administrative centre) by road. Ivanovka and 5,450 km are the nearest rural localities.

References 

Rural localities in Kabansky District
Populated places on Lake Baikal